Jan van der Elburcht (1500–1571) was an early Dutch painter. His name is derived from Elburg, his town of birth.

Biography
According to Karel van Mander he was called cleen Hansken (little Hans), and was known for landscapes. Sandrart called him der kleine Hans and claimed he was known for his altarpiece for the fisher's altar in the Onze-Lieve-Vrouwekathedraal, Antwerp depicting the Miraculous catch of fish.

According to the RKD he became a member of the Antwerp Guild of St. Luke in 1536. He was a history painter.  He died in Antwerp.

References

1500 births
1571 deaths
Early Netherlandish painters
People from Elburg
Painters from Antwerp
Dutch Renaissance painters